Dieselpoint, Inc. is a privately held enterprise search company headquartered in Chicago, IL. The company was founded in 1999 and develops software to search large datasets with both structured and unstructured elements.

The company focuses on scalable search and faceted navigation, which enables search results to be ordered and classified in multiple ways based on like attributes. Result sets of any size can then be navigated using dynamically-generated menus. Menus are generated from the underlying document attributes or metadata. These are designed to give users context-dependent browse capability, allowing them to see what options are available to them at each step.
Dieselpoint's software is used in a variety of applications including e-commerce, document search, site search, PLM, ECM and OEM. Dieselpoint's APIs and search platform are written entirely in Java to simplify implementation and enable interoperability within a range of environments.

In 2006, 2007 and 2008 Dieselpoint was recognized by KM World magazine as one of the "Top 100 Companies that Matter in Knowledge Management." Dieselpoint competitors include Autonomy Corporation, Fast Search & Transfer ASA and Endeca Technologies Inc.

References

External links
  Company website
 Dieselpoint description on SearchTools.com
 Faceted search description on SearchTools.com
 KMWorld.com 100 Companies that Matter

Software companies based in Illinois
Software companies established in 1999
Companies based in Chicago
Software companies of the United States
1999 establishments in Illinois